William Brent Cotter  is a Canadian member of the Senate of Canada from the province of Saskatchewan. On January 30, 2020, Cotter was nominated by Prime Minister Justin Trudeau to fill a vacant Senate seat for Saskatchewan.

Cotter was formerly dean of law at the University of Saskatchewan and was one of the original professors and writers in the field of legal ethics in Canada. Prior to his academic career, Cotter was a public servant for the government of Saskatchewan and served as Deputy Minister of Justice and Deputy Attorney General and has also served as the province's Deputy Minister of Intergovernmental and Aboriginal Affairs.

References

External links 
 

Living people
Canadian senators from Saskatchewan
Independent Senators Group
21st-century Canadian politicians
Academic staff of the University of Saskatchewan
Saskatchewan civil servants
Lawyers in Saskatchewan
Canadian King's Counsel
1949 births